Gmunden is a town in Upper Austria, Austria in the district of Gmunden. It has 13,204 inhabitants (estimates 2016 ).

Geography
It is situated next to the lake Traunsee on the Traun River and is surrounded by high mountains, including the Traunstein (mountain), the Erlakogel (5150 ft), the Wilder Kogel and the Höllengebirge.

Municipal arrangement
Gmunden is divided into the following boroughs: Gmunden, Gmunden-Ort, Schlagen, Traundorf, Unterm Stein.

Neighboring municipalities

Population
As of 2001, Gmunden had a population of 13,336; Approximately 88.4% were Austrian by nationality, 1.5% are from other European Union states, and 10.2% are other foreigners. Largest non-EU minorities were from Bosnia and Herzegovina (3.6%) and the former FR Yugoslavia (i.e. present-day Serbia, Montenegro, Kosovo; 2.7%), followed by Turks (1.2%) and Germans (1.1%).

The majority (69.3%) are Roman Catholic by faith. Evangelicals make up the largest minority at 7.3%, followed by 5.9% Muslims and 3.3% Eastern Orthodox. Approximately 10.3% are irreligious.

History
In 1000 BCE the Illyrians were mining salt here. A settlement was already in existence in the fifth century CE. By 1186 Gmunden was a fortified place surrounded by walls, although it did not receive a church until about 1300. In 1278 Gmunden became a town. On November 14, 1626, an army of rebellious peasants was completely defeated at Gmunden by General Pappenheim, who had been ordered by Maximilian I to suppress the peasant rebellion in Upper Austria. 
The dead peasant insurgents were buried in nearby Pinsdorf, where an obelisk styled memorial known as the Bauernhügel in their honour can still be seen.

Gmunden supplied naval ships to Austria during the 17th century and helped wounded soldiers in hospitals in World War I. During World War II, an SS maternity home was located here, "to insure racial purity" in accordance with Nazi racial theories.

In later years, it was much frequented as a health and summer resort, and had a variety of lake, brine, vegetable and pine-cone baths, a hydropathic establishment, inhalation chambers, whey cure, etc. It was also an important centre of the salt industry in Salzkammergut.

Politics
The local council consists of 37 members.  In the last municipal election in 2021, the following are seats won by the political parties:
16 ÖVP, 7 GRÜNE, 5 SPÖ, 5 FPÖ und 4 NEOS.
 ÖVP: 16 seats
 FPÖ: 5 seats
 SPÖ: 5 seats
 NEOS: 4 seats
 Die Grünen: 7 seats

Mayors:

 1946–1955: Fritz Eiblhuber
 1955–1956: Alfred Klimesch
 1956–1973: Karl Piringer
 1973–1979: Karl Sandmeier (1917-2000)
 1979–1997: Erwin Herrmann
 1997–2014: Heinz Köppl
 2014– ... Stefan Krapf (ÖVP)

Main sights

The town hall is also a popular tourist destination.

Education
In Gmunden there are four kindergartens, four elementary schools and three Hauptschulen. The three high schools are BG/BRG Gmunden, BRG Schloss Traunsee, and Gymnasium Ort.

People 

 Caspar Erasmus Duftschmid, born in Gmunden
 Heinrich Schiff, cellist and conductor, born in Gmunden
 Duchess Maria Amalia of Württemberg, born in Gmunden; see Albrecht, Duke of Württemberg and Georg, Crown Prince of Saxony
 Johannes von Gmunden astronomer and mathematician
 Helmut Trawöger (1948-) Conductor and flautist, born in Gmunden
 Andreas Berger, born in Gmunden
 Princess Marie Louise of Hanover, born in Gmunden
 Princess Alexandra of Hanover (1882–1963), born at the Schloss Ort, Gmuden
 Prince Otto Heinrich of Hanover, born in Gmuden
 Levente Szörényi, lead singer of Hungarian rock band Illés, born in Gmunden

Famous residents 
 Conchita Wurst, drag queen and winner of Eurovision Song Contest 2014
 Thomas Bernhard, playwright and novelist
 George V of Hanover, exiled here
 Ernest Augustus, Crown Prince of Hanover, exiled and died in Gmunden
 Princess Thyra of Denmark, lived and died in Gmunden
 Princess Marie of Hanover, lived and died in Gmunden
 Ludwig Bemelmans, grew up in Gmunden
 Gabi Burgstaller, went to high school in Gmunden
 Walter Reder, buried in Gmuden
 Betty Haag, worked near in Gmunden as a professor
 Jory Vinikour, worked as a teacher at the Austrian Baroque Academy of Gmunden
 Marie of Saxe-Altenburg,  exiled and died in Gmunden
 Princess Frederica of Hanover, lived in Gmunden
 Frederick Francis IV, Grand Duke of Mecklenburg, married in Gmunden
 Christoph Ransmayr, grew up near in Gmunden
 Carl Rahl, lived here
 Christian Griepenkerl, lived here
 John Haswell, worked here
 Horaz Krasnopolski, died here
 Matthias von Schönerer, worked here
 Count Richard Belcredi, died here
 Archduchess Margarete Sophie of Austria, died here
 Princess Maria Antonia of the Two Sicilies, died here
 Prince Ludwig Rudolph of Hanover, died in Gmunden

See also
 Gmunden Straßenbahn, the town tramway.

References

External links
 

 Gmunden's official homepage
 Schloss Ort Gmunden
 Pictures of Gmunden

 
Cities and towns in Gmunden District
Historic Jewish communities